Evert Hansson (23 February 1908 – 17 January 1979) was a Swedish football midfielder.

References

1908 births
1979 deaths
Footballers from Gothenburg
Association football midfielders
Swedish footballers
Sweden international footballers
Örgryte IS players
Allsvenskan players